Warnock is an old-style typeface commissioned by Chris Warnock in honor of his father, John Warnock, in 1997. It was designed by Robert Slimbach and first published in 2000 as Warnock Pro.

References

External links 
 Warnock at Typekit
 Warnock at Typedia

Typefaces and fonts introduced in 2000
Adobe typefaces
Digital typefaces
Old style serif typefaces
Typefaces designed by Robert Slimbach